James G. Perkins is a former English rugby union coach and currently, Chief Operating Officer at Procopio, Cory, Hargreaves & Savitch LLP, as well as director of the United States Rugby Football Federation.

Career
After moving from England to the United States, Jim Perkins played rugby in the Chicago Lions. When his playing days were over, Perkins began a long coaching career, coaching the Midwest All-Stars before coaching the United States National Rugby Team. Perkins retired from coaching after taking the Eagles to the 1991 Rugby World Cup. He is currently COO of Procopio, Cory, Hargreaves & Savitch, LLP, in San Diego.

Notes

External links

Date of birth unknown
English rugby union coaches
British expatriates in the United States
Living people
Year of birth missing (living people)